was a village located in Shimohei District, Iwate Prefecture, Japan.

History
The village of Kawai was created on April 1, 1889 within Nakahei District with the establishment of the municipalities system. Nakahei was merged with Higashihei and Kitahei districts to form Shimohei District on March 29, 1896. On July 1, 1955, Kawai annexed the neighboring village of Oguni.

On January 1, 2010, Kawai was merged into the expanded city of Miyako, and no longer exists as an independent municipality.

As of January 1, 2006, the village had an estimated population of 2,952 and a population density of 5.2 persons per km². The total area was 563.07 km².

Climate

References

External links

 Official website of Miyako 

Dissolved municipalities of Iwate Prefecture
Miyako, Iwate